Shibe may refer to:

 Shibe Park, a former baseball stadium in Philadelphia, Pennsylvania, United States
 Ben Shibe (1838–1922), American sporting goods and baseball executive 
 Sean Shibe (born 1992), Japanese-Scottish guitarist
 Shiba Inu, a breed of dog with origins in Japan